Valentin Iulian Crețu (born 2 January 1989) is a Romanian professional footballer who plays as a defender for Liga I club FCSB.

Club career
Crețu made his Liga I debut in the 2008–09 season in a game played for Gloria Buzău, against Steaua București which ended 1–1.

Career statistics

Club
Statistics accurate as of match played 26 February 2023.

International

Honours
Râmnicu Sărat
 Liga III: 2008–09

FCSB
 Cupa României: 2019–20
Supercupa României runner-up: 2020

References

External links
 

1989 births
Living people
People from Buzău
Romanian footballers
Romania international footballers
Association football defenders
Liga I players
FC Gloria Buzău players
CS Concordia Chiajna players
FC Rapid București players
AFC Săgeata Năvodari players
CS Gaz Metan Mediaș players
3. Liga players
FC Energie Cottbus players
ACS Poli Timișoara players
FC Steaua București players
Romanian expatriate footballers
Romanian expatriate sportspeople in Germany
Expatriate footballers in Germany